Michael John Bowden  (21 March 1947 – 11 April 2020) was an Australian rules football player and Indigenous advocate. Bowden played 59 matches for the Richmond Football Club in the VFL between 1967 and 1971. Following his playing career he became an educator in the Northern Territory and a passionate advocate for Indigenous communities, for which he received a Medal of the Order of Australia (OAM).

Football career
Bowden attended St Kevins College where he won the school's 1964 best and fairest and at the same time played for the  under 19s program before quitting to study as a priest at Corpus Christi College. He left the seminary after two years and returned to Richmond, where he made his senior league debut in round 8 of the 1967 season, playing as a ruck-rover.

Bowden was a premiership player in 1969, after leading the league with 194 handballs that season.

He was appointed the club's reserves-grade captain the following season and lead that team to a reserves premiership in the 1971 season.

Post-football career, family and illness
Bowden became a teacher, and eventually principal, of remote community schools for Indigenous Australian students in the Northern Territory. He was awarded a Medal of the Order of Australia (OAM) for service to the Indigenous community of the Northern Territory in January 2020.

Two more sons, Rhett and Kane, played for the Port Melbourne Football Club in the VFA.

Bowden suffered from motor neuron disease in later life and died from the affliction on 11 April 2020.

VFL statistics

|- style="background-color: #EAEAEA"
! scope="row" style="text-align:center" | 1967
|
| 11 || 7 || 2 || 3 || 69 || 30 || 99 || 20 || - || 0.3 || 0.4 || 9.9 || 4.3 || 14.1 || 2.9 || -
|-
! scope="row" style="text-align:center" | 1968
|
| 11 || 15 || 3 || 9 || 160 || 146 || 306 || 38 || - || 0.2 || 0.6 || 10.7 || 9.7 || 20.4 || 2.5 || -
|- style="background-color: #EAEAEA"
! scope="row" style="text-align:center" | 1969
|
| 11 || 20 || 6 || 4 || 185 || 194 || 379 || 87 || - || 0.3 || 0.2 || 9.3 || 9.7 || 19.0 || 4.4 || -
|-
! scope="row" style="text-align:center" | 1970
|
| 11 || 12 || 4 || 3 || 100 || 118 || 218 || 55 || - || 0.3 || 0.3 || 8.3 || 9.8 || 18.2 || 4.6 || -
|- style="background-color: #EAEAEA"
! scope="row" style="text-align:center" | 1971
|
| 11 || 5 || 5 || 0 || 18 || 25 || 43 || 10 || - || 1.0 || 0.0 || 3.6 || 5.0 || 8.6 || 2.0 || -
|-
|- class="sortbottom"
! colspan=3| Career
! 59
! 20
! 19
! 532
! 513
! 1045
! 210
! -
! 0.3
! 0.3
! 9.0
! 8.7
! 17.7
! 3.6
! -
|}

References

 Hogan P: The Tigers Of Old, Richmond FC, Melbourne 1996

External links
 
 
 Michael Bowden's profile at Tigerland Archive

1947 births
2020 deaths
Richmond Football Club players
Richmond Football Club Premiership players
Australian rules footballers from Victoria (Australia)
Neurological disease deaths in Australia
Deaths from motor neuron disease
Recipients of the Medal of the Order of Australia
Australian schoolteachers
People educated at St Kevin's College, Melbourne
One-time VFL/AFL Premiership players
Australian indigenous rights activists